"" (Ah dear Christians be comforted) is a Lutheran hymn in German with lyrics by Johannes Gigas, written in 1561. A penitential hymn, it was the basis for Bach's chorale cantata .

History 
Johannes Gigas, also called Johannes Henne, wrote a hymn of consolation and penitence. It appeared first in Frankfurt an der Oder in 1561, mentioning Gigas as the author ("durch Johan. Gigas"). It was part of a hymnal Gesangbüchlin in Augsburg in 1570, and of a Leipzig hymnal of 1586. In an 1817 hymnal, it appears in the section "Trost in Sterbegefahr" (Consolation in danger of death). It has also been described as a penitential hymn.

Lyrics 
The lyricist tries to give comfort to "dear Christians" (lieben Christen). From the second stanza, he uses the plural "uns" (us) including himself as part of a group united in the same situation. The text is in six stanzas of seven lines each:

The lyricist is convinced that affliction may be a deserved punishment, and invites an attitude of penitent remorse, placing everything in God's hands. He compares man to a grain of wheat, meant to bear fruit, which is possible on fertile soil. He recommends dying in the manner of Simeon, who "recognises his sins, grasps Christ" (sein Sünd' erkennt, Christum ergreifst). In the fifth stanza, he compares the shelter of God for body and soul to a hen covering her chicks with her wings. Finally, he confirms that we belong to God whether we are awake or sleep, that we are helped by Christ in all need, and he ends with praise.

Tune and music 
Zahn 4521b is a hymn tune composed for "". The hymn has been associated with several other melodies, including the well-known tune of "Wo Gott der Herr nicht bei uns hält", Zahn 4441a.

Johann Sebastian Bach used the hymn, with the Zahn 4441a melody, in his chorale cantata , composed in 1724 for the 17th Sunday after Trinity. He used three stanzas of the original text, the first as a chorale fantasia, the third with the solo soprano singing, and he closed the work with a four-part setting of the final stanza. The chorale harmonisation BWV 256 is another setting of the hymn by Bach, using the same melody. Other extant uses by Bach of the Zahn 4441a tune refer to other hymn texts.

References 

16th-century hymns in German
Lutheran hymns